Haasiidae is a family of millipedes belonging to the order Chordeumatida.

Genera:
 Acherosoma
 Likasoma Strasser, 1966
 Macrotelosoma Strasser, 1935
 Olotyphlops

References

Chordeumatida
Millipede families